Spui is a RandstadRail station in central The Hague, Netherlands. It opened on 16 October 2004 as part of the city's new tram tunnel. RandstadRail lines 3 and 4, and tram lines 2 en 6 stop here. This station is not to be confused with the Spui/Stadhuis station.

RandstadRail services 
The following services currently call at Spui:

Tram Services 

RandstadRail stations in The Hague